Closterocoris amoenus is a species of plant bug in the family Miridae. It is found in Central America and North America.

Description 
The parempodia are more slender, straplike, and less robust than those of nearly all other Miridae. The inner surface of the parempodia is striated. 

They diverge from other Miridae with a reduced and apomorphic apex (highest part of the body).

References

Further reading

 

Articles created by Qbugbot
Insects described in 1887
Herdoniini